The Chalcedonian Definition (also called the Chalcedonian Creed or the Definition of Chalcedon) is a declaration of Christ's nature (that it is dyophysite), adopted at the Council of Chalcedon in AD 451. Chalcedon was an early centre of Christianity located in Asia Minor. The council was the fourth of the ecumenical councils that are accepted by Chalcedonian churches which include the Catholic, Eastern Orthodox, Lutheran, Anglican and Reformed churches.
 
It was the first council not to be recognised by any Oriental Orthodox church; for this reason these churches may be classified as Non-Chalcedonian.

Context
The Council of Chalcedon was summoned to consider the Christological question in light of the "one-nature" view of Christ proposed by Eutyches, archimandrite at Constantinople, which prevailed at the Second Council of Ephesus in 449, sometimes referred to as the "Robber Synod".

The Council first solemnly ratified the Nicene Creed adopted in 325 and that creed as amended by the First Council of Constantinople in 381. It also confirmed the authority of two synodical letters of Cyril of Alexandria and the letter of Pope Leo I to Flavian of Constantinople.

Content
The full text of the definition reaffirms the decisions of the Council of Ephesus, the pre-eminence of the Creed of Nicaea (325) and the further definitions of the Council of Constantinople (381).

In one of the translations into English, the key section, emphasizing the double nature of Christ (human and divine), runs:

The Definition implicitly addressed a number of popular heretical beliefs. The reference to "co-essential with the Father" was directed at Arianism; "co-essential with us" is directed at Apollinarianism; "Two Natures unconfusedly, unchangeably" refutes Eutychianism; and "indivisibly, inseparably" and "Theotokos" are against Nestorianism.

Oriental Orthodox dissent
The Chalcedonian Definition was written amid controversy between the Western and Eastern churches over the meaning of the Incarnation (see Christology). The Western church readily accepted the creed, but some Eastern churches did not. Political disturbances prevented the Armenian bishops from attending. Even though Chalcedon reaffirmed the Third Council's condemnation of Nestorius, the Non-Chalcedonians always suspected that the Chalcedonian Definition tended towards Nestorianism. This was in part because of the restoration of a number of bishops deposed at the Second Council of Ephesus, bishops who had previously indicated what appeared to be support of Nestorian positions.

The Coptic Church of Alexandria dissented, holding to Cyril of Alexandria's preferred formula for the oneness of Christ's nature in the incarnation of God the Word as "out of two natures". Cyril's language is not consistent and he may have countenanced the view that it is possible to contemplate in theory two natures after the incarnation, but the Church of Alexandria felt that the Definition should have stated that Christ be acknowledged "out of two natures" rather than "in two natures".

The definition defines that Christ is "acknowledged in two natures", which "come together into one person and one hypostasis". The formal definition of "two natures" in Christ was understood by the critics of the council at the time, and is understood by many historians and theologians today, to side with western and Antiochene Christology and to diverge from the teaching of Cyril of Alexandria, who always stressed that Christ is "one". However, a modern analysis of the sources of the creed (by A. de Halleux, in Revue Theologique de Louvain 7, 1976) and a reading of the acts, or proceedings, of the council show that the bishops considered Cyril the great authority and that even the language of "two natures" derives from him.

This dyophysite position, historically characterised by Chalcedonian followers as "monophysitism", though this is denied by the dissenters, formed the basis for the distinction of the Coptic Church of Egypt and Ethiopia and the "Jacobite" churches of Syria, and the Armenian Apostolic Church (see Oriental Orthodoxy) from other churches.

References

Sources

External links
The Chalcedonian Creed in Greek at www.earlychurchtexts.com. (with dictionary lookup links)
Definition of Chalcedon

5th-century Christian texts
Christian statements of faith
Christology
Christian terminology
Nature of Jesus Christ